Conasprella edpetuchi also known as Conasprella (Dalliconus) edpetuchi, and originally described as Dalliconus edpetuchi, is a species of predatory sea snail, a marine gastropod mollusc in the family Conidae, the cone snails and their allies.

Like all species within the genus Conasprella, these snails are predatory and venomous. They are capable of "stinging" humans, therefore live ones should be handled carefully or not at all.

Description
Its shape is conical with a striated, turriculate spire with 13 to 15 whorls. The paucispiral protoconch contains about two whorls. The teleoconch contains about 5 to 9 spiral grooves on the sutural ramps and 25 to 30 small beadlike nodules on subsutural ridge ar about two-thirds from the top. The body whorl is smooth with sigmoid sides and a deep anal notch. The long aperture is almost straight with a very straight siphonal lip. The white spire shows brown, regularly scattered blotches. The same blotches are found on the body whorl in irregularly interrupted spiral bands.

Distribution
This species occurs in the Atlantic Ocean, in deep water off central to southern Brazil.

References

External links
 Holotype in MNHN, Paris

edpetuchi
Gastropods described in 2015